Lykkens musikanter is a 1962 Danish film directed by Peer Guldbrandsen and starring Ellen Gottschalch.

Cast
 Ellen Gottschalch - Lydia Wiljengren
 Ove Sprogøe - Havemand Texas
 Dirch Passer - Elevatorfører Gogol
 Kjeld Petersen - Sagfører Dagerman
 Bent Mejding - Sagfører Rolf Dagerman
 Ulla Lock - Nancy Hansen
 Frede Heiselberg - Jon Dagerman
 Hans W. Petersen - Tømmerhandler Dagerman
 Bertel Lauring - Slagteren
 Ingela Brander - Solveig
 Helle Halding - Rakel
 Michaela Davidsen - Ung kontordame

External links

1962 films
1960s Danish-language films
Danish black-and-white films
Films directed by Peer Guldbrandsen
Films scored by Sven Gyldmark